Johann Kraus was an Austrian footballer. He played in one match for the Austria national football team in 1916, scoring a goal.

References

External links
 

Year of birth missing
Year of death missing
Austrian footballers
Austria international footballers
Place of birth missing
Association footballers not categorized by position